Adoré Floupette is the collective pseudonym of French authors Henri Beauclair and Gabriel Vicaire used for their 1885 literary spoof titled Les Déliquescences d'Adoré Floupette, a collection of poems satirising French symbolism and the Decadent movement.

Stanley Chapman's translation was published by the Atlas Press.

The Australian author David Brooks argued in his 2011 book, The Sons of Clovis, that the Ern Malley hoax was modelled on this work.

References

Literary forgeries
Hoaxes in France
19th-century hoaxes
1885 in France
1885 books
Collective pseudonyms
French poets
French male poets